The 1950–51 New York Knicks season was the fifth season for the team in the National Basketball Association (NBA). In the regular season, the Knicks finished in third place in the Eastern Division, and their 36–30 record gave them a berth in the NBA Playoffs for the fifth consecutive year.

New York faced the Boston Celtics in the first round of the Eastern Division playoffs, and won the best-of-three series 2–0 to advance to the division finals. In that series, the Knicks defeated the Syracuse Nationals 3–2 in a best-of-five series, earning the franchise's first trip to the NBA Finals. The Rochester Royals faced the Knicks in the Finals, and won the first three games of the best-of-seven series. New York won the next three games to even up the series, but Rochester won the seventh game by a score of 79–75.

NBA draft

Note: This is not an extensive list; it only covers the first and second rounds, and any other players picked by the franchise that played at least one game in the league.

Roster

|-
! colspan="2" style="background-color: #FF7518;  color: #FFFFFF; text-align: center;" | New York Knicks 1950–51 roster
|- style="background-color: #0000FF; color: #FFFFFF;   text-align: center;"
! Players !! Coaches
|- 
| valign="top" |

! Pos. !! # !! Nat. !! Name !! Ht. !! Wt. !! From
|-

Regular season

Season standings

x = clinched playoff spot

Record vs. opponents

Game log

Playoffs

|- align="center" bgcolor="#ccffcc"
| 1
| March 20
| @ Boston
| W 83–69
| Vince Boryla (20)
| —
| Boston Garden
| 1–0
|- align="center" bgcolor="#ccffcc"
| 2
| March 22
| Boston
| W 92–78
| Max Zaslofsky (27)
| Dick McGuire (9)
| Madison Square Garden III
| 2–0
|-

|- align="center" bgcolor="#ccffcc" 
| 1
| March 28
| Syracuse
| W 103–92
| Vince Boryla (30)
| Dick McGuire (13)
| Madison Square Garden III
| 1–0
|- align="center" bgcolor="#ffcccc" 
| 2
| March 29
| @ Syracuse
| L 80–102
| Ray Lumpp (16)
| Vandeweghe, McGuire (5)
| State Fair Coliseum
| 1–1
|- align="center" bgcolor="#ccffcc" 
| 3
| March 31
| Syracuse
| W 77–75 (OT)
| Harry Gallatin (18)
| —
| Madison Square Garden III
| 2–1
|- align="center" bgcolor="#ffcccc" 
| 4
| April 1
| @ Syracuse
| L 83–90
| Max Zaslofsky (20)
| Dick McGuire (9)
| State Fair Coliseum
| 2–2
|- align="center" bgcolor="#ccffcc" 
| 5
| April 4
| Syracuse
| W 83–81
| Vince Boryla (23)
| Ernie Vandeweghe (5)
| Madison Square Garden III
| 3–2
|-

|- align="center" bgcolor="#ffcccc"
| 1
| April 7
| @ Rochester
| L 65–92
| Vince Boryla (13)
| Simmons, Clifton (10)
| Ernie Vandeweghe (4)
| Edgerton Park Arena4,200
| 0–1
|- align="center" bgcolor="#ffcccc"
| 2
| April 8
| @ Rochester
| L 84–99
| Max Zaslofsky (28)
| Harry Gallatin (17)
| Vince Boryla (7)
| Edgerton Park Arena4,200
| 0–2
|- align="center" bgcolor="#ffcccc"
| 3
| April 11
| Rochester
| L 71–78
| Vince Boryla (20)
| Nat Clifton (11)
| Dick McGuire (7)
| 69th Regiment Armory5,000
| 0–3
|- align="center" bgcolor="#ccffcc"
| 4
| April 13
| Rochester
| W 79–73
| Harry Gallatin (22)
| Nat Clifton (17)
| Zaslofsky, Clifton (6)
| 69th Regiment Armory4,000
| 1–3
|- align="center" bgcolor="#ccffcc"
| 5
| April 15
| @ Rochester
| W 92–89
| Connie Simmons (26)
| Nat Clifton (10)
| Nat Clifton (7)
| Edgerton Park Arena4,200
| 2–3
|- align="center" bgcolor="#ccffcc"
| 6
| April 18
| Rochester
| W 80–73
| Max Zaslofsky (23)
| Ernie Vandeweghe (8)
| Dick McGuire (6)
| 69th Regiment Armory4,500
| 3–3
|- align="center" bgcolor="#ffcccc"
| 7
| April 21
| @ Rochester
| L 75–79
| Zaslofsky, Boryla (16)
| Harry Gallatin (10)
| Ernie Vandeweghe (5)
| Edgerton Park Arena4,200
| 3–4
|-

Player statistics

Season

Playoffs

Awards and records
Dick McGuire, All-NBA Second Team

See also
1950–51 NBA season

References

External links
1950–51 New York Knickerbockers Statistics
Royals Reign, Despite Knicks' Unlikely Comeback

New York Knicks
New York Knicks seasons
New York Knicks
New York Knicks seasons
1950s in Manhattan
Madison Square Garden